Branham High School is a secondary school in San Jose, California, located in the Cambrian neighborhood within the West San Jose region. It opened on September 13, 1967, under the Campbell Union High School District (CUHSD) and closed in 1991. The District leased the campus to Valley Christian Schools in 1991. The school was reopened by CUHSD in 1999 due to increased enrollment within the district. The school is named after Isaac Branham, a Californian pioneer who became a successful farmer and lumber mill owner. 

The school colors are navy blue, Columbia blue, and white and the official mascot is the Bruin.

As of March 2022, the school also has a boba drink dedicated to them by the locally owned business Boba Pub called "Blu's Bev". This was made possible through a partnership between the business and Branham's associated student body (ASB).

Academics

Accreditation 
Branham was awarded the title of California Distinguished School during the 2006–2007 school year and was fully accredited by the Western Association of Schools and Colleges in March 2022.

AP Courses 
Branham participates in the College Board's Advanced Placement program and, as of the 2021-2022 school year, offers AP courses in the following:
English Language and Composition, English Literature and Composition, World History: Modern, US History, American Government, Biology, Chemistry, Environmental Science, Physics 1 & 2, Psychology, Calculus AB & BC, Statistics, French Language & Culture, Spanish Language and Culture, Spanish Literature and Culture, Chinese Language and Culture, Computer Science A and Principles, Studio Art 2D & 3D, and Art History.

Athletics
Branham High School is a member of the Blossom Valley Athletic League (BVAL).

Branham fields teams in football, basketball, baseball, volleyball, swimming and diving, cheerleading, tennis, badminton, soccer, softball, track and field, cross country, golf, field hockey, and wrestling. All of Branham's league and section championships are displayed in its gymnasium, the Bruin Den.

Music & Theater Departments

Music Department 
The Branham High School Music Department consists of the vocal music department and the instrumental music department. The choir is made up of Madrigals and Women's. The instrumental music program is made up of Field Marching Band, Color Guard, Parade Band, Pep Band, Symphonic Band, Wind Ensemble, Guitar, and Jazz Ensemble.

The marching band has recently been named the Branham High School Royal Alliance.

The Branham High School Symphonic Band, in its first CMEA performance in the history of the school, received a Unanimous Superior rating, the highest rating a group can receive from the California Music Educators Association. In addition, the band was invited to perform at Carnegie Hall and Chicago Symphony Hall due to their performance at the 2009 Los Angeles Heritage Festival, where they had placed first in the Symphonic Band category. In April 2011, the band received its second Unanimous Superior rating from CMEA.

The Branham High School Royal Alliance Marching Band and Color Guard is known for award winning performances and had an undefeated season in the fall of 2020 with their show “It’s About Time”.

The Branham Jazz Ensemble gives nearly a dozen public performances per year and travels to the Columbia Jazz Festival. The Jazz Ensemble hosts a yearly fundraiser called the Jazz Cafe to raise funds for the Branham Instrumental Program. As of March 2022, the director of the band program is Christopher Nalls, while the director of the choir program is Barbara West.

Theater Department 
The department earned the 2001 Glenn Hoffman Award for Outstanding Fine Arts Curriculum. In 2003, the program earned the 2003 High School Musical Honors Award for Outstanding Ensemble.

The department currently offers a full theater curriculum including a musical theater course, a drama club, and several productions each year. Its annual faculty musical is directed by students and supervised by the acting instructor.

Career Technical Education (CTE) Courses
The Career Technical Education courses offered at Branham currently include Culinary Arts, Journalism, Yearbook, and PLTW (Project Lead the Way).

The journalism class is known for its award-winning newspaper, the Bear Witness, which has been named a National Scholastic Press Association Pacemaker winner in 2018, 2019 and 2020. It has earned second place in Social Media reporting in 2020 and 2021.

Notable alumni

Robertson Daniel (Class of 2010) - Former American football cornerback for the Oakland Raiders, Green Bay Packers, Washington Football Team, and Baltimore Ravens of the National Football League (NFL). Currently a member of the Calgary Stampeders of the Canadian Football League. Played collegiately at Brigham Young University.
Pat Hughes (Class of 1973) - Radio play-by-play announcer for the Chicago Cubs of the Major League Baseball (MLB).
Marty Krulee (Class of 1974) - Sprinter and track-and-field athlete.
Gary Radnich (Class of 1969) - Sports anchor for KRON-TV, San Francisco. Former basketball player at Brigham Young University, later transferring to the University of Nevada, Las Vegas.
Louie Sakoda (Class of 2005) - Professional placekicker and punter for the Edmonton Eskimos of the Canadian Football League.
Roger Samuels (Class of 1979) - Former MLB pitcher who played for the San Francisco Giants and Pittsburgh Pirates. 
Darnell Sankey (Class of 2012) - Former American football linebacker for the Denver Broncos, Oakland Raiders, Kansas City Chiefs, Minnesota Vikings, Baltimore Ravens, Detroit Lions, Indianapolis Colts, and New Orleans Saints of the NFL. Played collegiately at California State University, Sacramento.

See also
Santa Clara County high schools

References

External links

 
 Branham High School Athletics
 Branham High School Marching Band

Campbell Union High School District
Educational institutions established in 1967
High schools in San Jose, California
Public high schools in California
1967 establishments in California